Honey is a 1981 Italian drama film directed by Gianfranco Angelucci. It stars Clio Goldsmith, Catherine Spaak, and Fernando Rey.

Plot
A writer compels a publisher to read her manuscript novel that tells the story of her first erotic adventures, under the name Anny.

Cast
Clio Goldsmith as Anny
Catherine Spaak as writer
Fernando Rey as Editor
Donatella Damiani as The Landlady
Nieves Navarro 
Lino Troisi 	 	
Adriana Russo as Inés
Giuseppe Pennese 	
Francisca Fernández

References

External links
 

1981 films
Italian drama films
1980s Italian-language films
1980s Italian films
1981 drama films